Peter Charles Collier (born 25 February 1959) is an Australian politician who has been a Liberal Party member of the Legislative Council of Western Australia since 2005, representing North Metropolitan Region. He served as a minister in the government of Colin Barnett from 2008 until its defeat at the 2017 election.

Early life
Collier was born in Kalgoorlie, Western Australia, to Beryl Lillian (née Davies) and Les Collier. He attended Eastern Goldfields Senior High School before going on to the University of Western Australia, where he studied teaching. After graduating, Collier taught at various high schools in the Perth metropolitan area, both public and private. He taught for periods at John Curtin Senior High School (1981–1983), Lesmurdie Senior High School (1985–1986), Presbyterian Ladies' College (1987–1988), and Scotch College (1990–2005). Outside of his teaching career, Collier was also a professional tennis coach. He spent a season on the WTA Tour in 1989, coaching Jenny Byrne, Jo-Anne Faull, and Dianne Van Rensburg.

Controversy
It was revealed in the media in 2021 that Collier was part of a factional group of powerbrokers within his party known as “The Clan”, alongside former federal finance minister Matthias Cormann and Nick Goiran. Leaked Whatsapp messages revealed that Collier sent sexist messages to other group members that referred to female Liberal members as “sandwich makers”, a “bitch” and “toxic cow”.

Politics
Collier first stood for parliament at the 2001 state election, running unsuccessfully in fourth position on the Liberal Party's ticket in North Metropolitan Region. Prior to the election, he had been accused of forging signatures on membership forms and using people's names without their consent in order to secure party preselection. He denied the allegations, and a police investigation found there was "insufficient evidence against him". At the 2005 state election, Collier was elevated to second position on the Liberal Party's ticket, and was elected to a term starting in May 2005. One of his unsuccessful opponents for preselection was Alan Cadby, a sitting member, who subsequently resigned from the Liberal Party to sit as an independent.

Collier was elevated to the Liberal shadow ministry shortly after his election, and served under four leaders of the opposition (Matt Birney, Paul Omodei, Troy Buswell, and Colin Barnett). After the Liberal Party's victory at the 2008 state election, he was made Minister for Energy and Minister for Training and Workforce Development in the new ministry formed by Colin Barnett. In December 2010, Collier was also made Minister for Aboriginal Affairs. In a ministerial reshuffle in June 2012, he replaced Liz Constable as Minister for Education, but lost the training portfolio to Murray Cowper. In a further reshuffle after the 2013 state election, Collier was made Minister for Electoral Affairs, but was replaced as energy minister by Mike Nahan. He also became leader of the Liberal Party in the Legislative Council.

Notes

References

|-

1959 births
Living people
Australian schoolteachers
Australian tennis coaches
Members of the Western Australian Legislative Council
People from Kalgoorlie
Liberal Party of Australia members of the Parliament of Western Australia
21st-century Australian politicians
Australian monarchists
Energy Ministers of Western Australia
University of Western Australia alumni